is a town and the administrative centre of the municipality of Kinn, Vestland, Norway. The town was founded by royal decree in 1860 as a ladested on the island of Florelandet, located between the Botnafjorden and Solheimsfjorden.   Florø is Norway's (and thus the Scandinavian Peninsula's) westernmost town. It is the most western town on the mainland in the Nordic countries.

The town encompasses the entire island of Florelandet and the western half of the island of Brandsøya.  The Norwegian national road Rv 5 is the main road connecting Florø to the rest of Norway.  The nearby villages of Brandsøy and Grov lie several kilometers to the east of Florø.  The islands of Reksta, Kinn, Skorpa lie several kilometers to the west of the town. Florø is also home to Florø Airport and Florø Church.

Florø is also a former municipality that existed as an independent town-municipality for just over 100 years (1860-1964) before being merged into the municipality of Flora. On 1 January 2020, the town became part of the new Kinn Municipality after another municipal merger.

Name
The municipality is named after the farm Flora since the town of Florø was built on its ground in 1860. The name is probably derived from flóð which means "(strong) stream".  The name of the town and former municipality of Florø has the same name, but instead of ending with an "a", it has the Danish word ø meaning "island" added to the end since the town is located on an island.

History

Florø was founded as a town (ladested) in 1860. Shortly after its founding, on 3 January 1861, it was removed from the (now) former municipality of Kinn and made into a municipality of its own with a population of 846.  During the 1960s, there were many municipal mergers across Norway due to the work of the Schei Committee. On 1 January 1964, the municipality of Florø (population: 2,040) was merged with Eikefjord (population: 919), Kinn (population: 3,567), the parts of Bru located north of the Førde Fjord (population: 1,155), the Husefest and Breivik areas of Bremanger (population: 9), and the Steindal area of Vevring (population: 25) to form the newly created municipality of Flora. On 1 January 2020, Flora was one of the municipalities that merged into a newly re-created Kinn municipality, much larger than the Kinn that existed until 1964.

Economy
The basis for the foundation of the town was the rich herring fisheries, symbolised by the three herrings in the town's coat of arms. Fishing is still an important part of the economy, in addition to shipbuilding and service industries.  After the discovery of petroleum in the North Sea in the 1960s, Florø has been used as a supply base for the petroleum industry.

Government

Municipal council
The municipal council  of Florø was made up of 21 representatives that were elected to four year terms.  The party breakdown of the final municipal council was as follows:

See also
List of towns and cities in Norway

References

External links

Kinn
Cities and towns in Norway
Populated places in Vestland
1860 establishments in Norway
Port cities and towns in Norway
Port cities and towns of the North Sea